Greatest Hits is a greatest hits compilation by Space, released on 8 July 2002 to coincide with Space's split with long-serving record label Gut Records.

Track listing
"Female of the Species" <small>(Scott/Space; taken from Spiders)</small> – 3:20
"Avenging Angels" (Scott/Space; taken from Tin Planet) – 2:59
"Neighbourhood" (Scott/Griffiths/Space; taken from Spiders) – 3:29
"The Ballad of Tom Jones" (with Cerys Matthews) (Scott/Space; taken from Tin Planet) – 4:10
"Sunny Afternoon" (with Tom Jones) (Davies; taken from the Tom Jones album Reload) – 3:27
"Money" (Scott/Griffiths/Space; taken from Spiders) – 4:02
"Begin Again" (Scott/Space; taken from Tin Planet) – 3:08
"We've Gotta Get Outta This Place" (Mann/Weil; taken from The Bad Days EP) – 3:20
"Bad Days" (Remix) (Scott/Space; taken from The Bad Days EP, original version taken from Tin Planet) – 3:23
"Dark Clouds" (Scott/Griffiths/Space; taken from Spiders) – 3:48
"Me And You Versus the World" (Scott/Griffiths/Space; taken from Spiders) – 3:37
"Diary of a Wimp" (Scott/Space; taken from Diary of a Wimp single, originally meant to be taken from Love You More than Football) – 2:47
"Gravity" (Murphy/Space; unreleased, originally meant to be taken from Love You More than Football) – 4:42
"The Shit You Talk is Beautiful" (Scott/Space, unreleased) – 2:20
"Spiders" (Scott/Space, taken from Me and You Versus the World single) – 2:51

Greatest Hits: Collectors Edition

On 16 May 2005, Greatest Hits'' was re-released as a two-disc "collectors edition", with the bonus disc compiling b-sides and remixes from their previous singles.

Track listing

Disc One 
"Female of the Species" (Scott/Space; taken from Spiders) – 3:20
"Avenging Angels" (Scott/Space; taken from Tin Planet) – 2:59
"Neighbourhood" (Scott/Griffiths/Space; taken from Spiders) – 3:29
"The Ballad of Tom Jones" (with Cerys Matthews) (Scott/Space; taken from Tin Planet) – 4:10
"Sunny Afternoon" (with Tom Jones) (Davies; taken from the Tom Jones album Reload) – 3:27
"Money" (Scott/Griffiths/Space; taken from Spiders) – 4:02
"Begin Again" (Scott/Space; taken from Tin Planet) – 3:08
"We've Gotta Get Outta This Place" (Mann/Weil; taken from The Bad Days EP) – 3:20
"Bad Days" (Remix) (Scott/Space; taken from The Bad Days EP, original version taken from Tin Planet) – 3:23
"Dark Clouds" (Scott/Griffiths/Space; taken from Spiders) – 3:48
"Me And You Versus the World" (Scott/Griffiths/Space; taken from Spiders) – 3:37
"Diary of a Wimp" (Scott/Space; taken from Diary of a Wimp single, originally meant to be taken from Love You More than Football) – 2:47
"Gravity" (Murphy/Space; unreleased, originally meant to be taken from Love You More than Football) – 4:42
"The Shit You Talk is Beautiful" (Scott/Space, unreleased) – 2:20
"Spiders" (Scott/Space, taken from Me and You Versus the World single) – 2:51

Disc Two
 "Theme From 'Baretta Vendetta'" – 6:07
 "Influenza" (Flu Mix) – 4:17
 "Raymond" – 2:11
 "Kill Me" (Radio Edit) – 3:50
 "Give Me Something" – 4:06
 "Children of the Night" – 4:22
 "Had Enough" – 6:20
 "You & Me Vs (The Dub)" – 5:05
 "Darker Clouds" – 4:45
 "Mister Psycho" – 3:40
 "Now She’s Gone" – 2:38
 "Stress Transmissions" – 3:55
 "Neighbourhood" (Piss Dup Stomp Mix) – 6:25
 "I Am Unlike Any Lifeform You’ve Ever Met" – 3:27
 "Female of the Species" (D’still’d Remix) – 8:56

References

2002 greatest hits albums
2005 greatest hits albums
Space (English band) albums
Gut Records albums